Luca Vanni was the defending champion but chose not to defend his title.

Florian Mayer won the title after defeating Daniil Medvedev 6–1, 6–2 in the final.

Seeds

Draw

Finals

Top half

Bottom half

References
 Main Draw
 Qualifying Draw

Tilia Slovenia Open - Singles
2016 Singles